Jakun is an Austronesian language, perhaps a dialect of Malay, spoken in Malaysia. Specifically it is spoken on the east coast and inland of Peninsular Malaysia, around the Pairang River, from Pekan in Pahang to Sri Gading, east to Benut, northwest to middle Muar River area around the districts of Segamat, Muar and Tangkak in Johor. It is also known as Djakun, Jakoon, Jaku’d, Jakud’n or Orang Hulu.

The language is native to the Jakun tribe belonging to the Proto-Malay branch of the indigenous natives of Malaysia, the Orang Asli.

References

External links 
 http://projekt.ht.lu.se/rwaai RWAAI (Repository and Workspace for Austroasiatic Intangible Heritage)
 http://hdl.handle.net/10050/00-0000-0000-0004-1640-2@view Jakun in RWAAI Digital Archive

Agglutinative languages
Languages of Malaysia

Malayic languages